Druk Wangditse Lhakhang("Temple of the Peak of Conquest"),() is located high on a forested ridge to the south of Tashichho Dzong and overlooks the whole Thimphu valley. It was established in 1715 as the seat of the 8th Druk Desi, Druk Rabgye. 

Druk Wangditse Lhakhang is one of the oldest temples in Thimphu, and considered an important heritage site of Bhutan. As it is located only a 40-minute walk from Sangaygang in Thimphu, it is also a popular local picnic spot and visitor attraction.

During the  2011 Himalayan earthquake, the original temple suffered extensive damage, but it has since been rebuilt, using a drawing of the earlier temple by Samuel Davis, who visited Bhutan in 1783, as well as archaeological findings, as a guide.  On January 24 to February 5 2020 it was re-consecrated in a ceremony led by the Laytshog Lopon, Sangay Dorji of the Zhung Dratshang.

The restored temple still contains the original large gilt copper image of Shakyamuni Buddha, flanked by the bodhisattvas Mañjuśrī and Avalokiteśvara. On each of the two side walls are four large stupas together representing the eight great stupas (Chöten Deshey-gyed,)l. On the second floor is a temple with murals depicting the deities of the mandalas of Hayagriva and Vajrakilaya
, as well as figures of Indian Mahasiddhas and successive lamas of the Bhutanese Drukpa Kagyu tradition At the rear of that floor there is a closed dharmapāla chapel dedicated to Yeshe Gonpo (Chaturbhuja Mahakala) which also contains images of Shri Devi (Palden Lhamo Dudsolma) and Tsheringma as well as  protetors of the 20 Dzonkhags.

References

External links
 Wangditse Dzong Restoration Project, Division for Cultural Heritage Sites, Department of Culture, Ministry of Home and Cultural Affairs. 

Drukpa Kagyu monasteries and temples in Bhutan
Thimphu